Šest černých dívek aneb Proč zmizel Zajíc is a 1969 Czechoslovak film. The film starred Josef Kemr.

References

External links
 

1969 films
Czechoslovak crime comedy films
1960s Czech-language films
Czech crime comedy films
1960s Czech films